The R620 is a regional route in KwaZulu-Natal, South Africa that connects Southbroom with Port Shepstone via Ramsgate, Margate, Uvongo and Shelly Beach.

It is an alternative route to the R61 Toll Highway (future N2 Wild Coast Toll Route) between Southbroom and Port Shepstone.

Route
The R620 begins at the intersection with the R102 in Oslo Beach, Port Shepstone. The R620 runs southward along the coast as Marine Drive and passes through Oslo Beach, crossing the Zotsha River and then going through Shelly Beach. From Shelly Beach it crosses the Mhlanga River entering St Michael's-on-sea and then entering Uvongo. It then intersects with Seaslopes Avenue south of Uvongo (which connects to the R61 highway) and after intersecting with the road it enters Margate.

It passes through the suburb of Manaba Beach, and then intersecting with Margate's main road, Marine Drive. The name Marine Drive is used for the main road and the R620 is then known as National Road after the intersection and bypasses Margate Central. It regains the name Marine Drive when it meets with the main road with the same name after bypassing Margate Central.

It then goes through Ramsgate then crossing the R61 as a flyover bridge and then curves back to the R61, crossing the Mbizane River and ends at the intersection with the R61 in Southbroom.

The R620 is the main road for the towns it passes through except for Margate.

Towns
The R620 passes through the following towns/settlements:
 Manaba Beach
 Margate
 Oslo Beach 
 Ramsgate
 Shelly Beach
 Southbroom 
 Uvongo

References

Regional Routes in KwaZulu-Natal